The discography of Mudhoney, a Seattle, Washington-based punk/grunge band, consists of ten studio albums, four compilation albums, five extended plays (EP), one live album, and twenty singles. This list does not include material recorded by Mudhoney band members with any other project.

Mudhoney was formed in 1988 by vocalist/guitarist Mark Arm and guitarist Steve Turner. The band signed with the independent label Sub Pop and released the Superfuzz Bigmuff EP in 1988 and their debut album Mudhoney in 1989.

After the release of Every Good Boy Deserves Fudge, in 1991, the band signed with Reprise Records and released its third full-length album Piece Of Cake. Before being dropped, Mudhoney released two more albums for the label.

Subsequently, the band signed again with Sub Pop in 2000 issuing Since We've Become Translucent in 2002. Four years later 2006's Under a Billion Suns was released followed in 2008 by The Lucky Ones, which garnered little attention. The Lucky Ones was followed five years later by Vanishing Point.

Albums

Studio albums

Compilation albums

Live albums

Extended plays

Singles

Notes

Long-form videos

Music videos

Other appearances

References

External links
 

Discography
Discographies of American artists
Rock music group discographies